Genovaitė (short form Genutė or Genė) is a Lithuanian given name that may refer to:

Genė Galinytė (born 1945), Lithuanian rower
Genovaitė Ramoškienė (born 1945), Lithuanian rower
Genovaitė Strigaitė (born 1942), Lithuanian rower

Lithuanian feminine given names